The  are a group of 31 islands in the Seto Inland Sea of Okayama Prefecture. They are part of the city of Kasaoka.

The seven inhabited islands in the group are:
 Takashima Island 高島 (岡山県笠岡市)
 Shiraishi Island, 白石島
 Kitagi Island, 北木島
 Ōbi Island, 大飛島
 Kobi Island, 小飛島
 Manabeshima, 真鍋島
 Mushima Island (Okayama), 六島 (岡山県)

Archipelagoes of Japan
Islands of Okayama Prefecture
Islands of the Seto Inland Sea
Archipelagoes of the Pacific Ocean